Sylvain Curinier (born 15 March 1969 in Lons-le-Saunier) is a French slalom canoeist who competed from the mid-1980s to the mid-1990s. He won a silver medal in the K1 event at the 1992 Summer Olympics in Barcelona.

Curinier also won a silver medal in the K1 team event at the 1993 ICF Canoe Slalom World Championships in Mezzana.

World Cup individual podiums

References
DatabaseOlympics.com profile

Sports-reference.com profile

1969 births
Canoeists at the 1992 Summer Olympics
French male canoeists
Living people
Olympic canoeists of France
Olympic silver medalists for France
Olympic medalists in canoeing
Medalists at the 1992 Summer Olympics
Medalists at the ICF Canoe Slalom World Championships
People from Lons-le-Saunier
Sportspeople from Jura (department)